The  is a rapid transit electric multiple unit (EMU) train type operated by the Transportation Bureau City of Nagoya on the Nagoya Subway Sakura-dōri Line in Japan since 1989, and (formerly) on the Meitetsu Toyota Line from 1987 until 1989 (1 set only).

Formation
The trainsets are formed as follows.

References

External links

 Nagoya Transportation Bureau's technical details about the 6000 series 
 Nagoya Transportation Bureau's synopsis of the 6000 series 
 Manufacturer's page on the 6000 series 

Electric multiple units of Japan
6000 series
Train-related introductions in 1987
1500 V DC multiple units of Japan
Nippon Sharyo multiple units